The University of Alabama School of Dentistry is the public dental school located at the University of Alabama in Birmingham, Alabama, United States. The dental school was founded in 1948 and is the only dental school in Alabama.

History 
The UAB School of Dentistry, a unit of the Medical Center of the University of Alabama at Birmingham, was created by an act of the state legislature in 1945, the same year that the School of Medicine moved to Birmingham from the university campus in Tuscaloosa and became a four-year school. The School of Dentistry admitted its first class of students in October 1948. In addition to its first professional degree (D.M.D.) program, the school offers accredited postdoctoral programs in twelve areas of study. The development of "four-handed dentistry" and the expanded utilization of trained auxiliary personnel were pioneered at this institution. From 2012 through 2015 the School was ranked first in research funding from the National Institute of Dental and Craniofacial Research.

Facilities 
The clinical facilities of the School of Dentistry Building include clinical teaching space and lecture halls.

Library facilities include the Lister Hill Library of the Health Sciences and the Hammonds Reading Room. The Lister Hill Library is located immediately adjacent to the basic science facility (Volker Hall) and offers a full range of comfortable accommodations for reading and study. The library collection now contains more than 255,000 volumes and includes subscriptions to the world's leading biomedical journals, with some 2,800 titles currently available. The library offers many computerized services. The computerized integrated catalog, DYNIX, and the full MEDLINE service are available from home or office by telephone. A microcomputer lab is available for student and faculty use. Other services include interlibrary loans, photocopying, information and instructional services, and search capabilities to a large number of on-line and compact disc databases.

See also

American Student Dental Association

References 

Dental schools in Alabama
Educational institutions established in 1948
Dentistry
1948 establishments in Alabama